Serge Théophile Balima  (born February 1, 1949) is a Burkinabé journalist, diplomat and professor of the University of Ouagadougou.

External links
Biography at La Petite Academie 

Burkinabé journalists
Burkinabé diplomats
1949 births
Living people
Academic staff of the University of Ouagadougou
21st-century Burkinabé people